Valiquette is a surname. Notable people with the surname include:

Esther Valiquette (1962 - 1994), Canadian documentary film director
Gilles Valiquette (born 1952), Canadian musician, actor and record producer
Jack Valiquette (born 1954), Canadian ice hockey player
Marigene Valiquette (born 1924), American politician
Max Valiquette (born 1973), Canadian television host
Steve Valiquette (born 1977), Canadian ice hockey player